Persea schiedeana, the coyo, is an endangered, evergreen tree in the laurel family (Lauraceae), native to tropical forests of southern Mexico and Central America. Its edible fruit resembles that of the avocado (Persea americana), a related tree in the genus Persea. Other common names include aguacate de montaña, aguacatón, chinini, and yas.

Coyo is native to southern Mexico and parts of Central America. It occurs at altitudes up to 2800 meters in lowlands and montane tropical forests. It is cultivated for fruit and used as graft stock for common avocado.

The tree grows to about 20 m high, occasionally reaching 50 m. Young branches are very hairy. The leaves are deciduous and the flowers are light greenish-yellow, with the stamens turning red with age. The fruit, closely resembling that of the avocado, is generally pear-shaped, with a thick, green, leathery skin. The flesh is oily with a milky juice and tastes like an avocado or coconut. The pear-shaped fruit is easily mistaken for an avocado. However, it contains a much larger central seed. The flesh has stone cells and a gritty texture that is generally considered unfavourable for edible consumption, despite its appealing taste. The cotyledons, unlike those of the avocado, are pink internally.

The seeds of the tree are dispersed by wild animals that eat the fruit, including tepezcuintle (Cuniculus paca), tejón coati (Nasua narica) and agoutis (Dasyprocta sp.).

This species is considered to be endangered due to loss of habitat as forests are cleared for agriculture.

References

schiedeana
Trees of Mexico
Trees of Panama
Vulnerable plants
Cloud forest flora of Mexico